Laxmibai Nagar–Ratlam DEMU is a passenger train of the Indian Railways, which runs between Laxmibai Nagar Junction railway station and Ratlam Junction railway station, both within Madhya Pradesh.

Arrival and departure

 Train no. 79312 departs from Laxmibai Nagar, daily at 06:45, reaching Ratlam the same day at 09:20.
 Train no. 79311 departs from Ratlam daily at 19:00. from platform no. 1 reaching Laxmibai Nagar the same day at 21:40.

Route and halts
The train goes via . The important halts of the train are:

 
 Palia railway station
 Balauda Takun railway station
 Ajnod railway station
 
 Osra railway station
 Gautampura Road railway station
 Pirjhalar railway station
 Barnagar railway station
 Sunderabad railway station
 Runija railway station
 Pritam Nagar railway station
 Nauganwan railway station

Average speed and frequency
The train runs with an average speed of 44 km/h and completes 115 km in 2 hrs 35 mim. The train runs on a daily basis.

References

External links 
 Indore 360

Transport in Indore
Railway services introduced in 2015
Rail transport in Madhya Pradesh
Diesel–electric multiple units of India
Transport in Ratlam